Excelsior is an unincorporated community in Candler County, in the U.S. state of Georgia.

History
The community was named after nearby Excelsior Schoolhouse. A post office called Excelsior was established in 1879, and remained in operation until 1905. Variant names were "Little Creek" and "Red Branch".

References

Unincorporated communities in Candler County, Georgia